is a town located in Kamikawa Subprefecture, Hokkaido, Japan.

As of April 28, 2017, the town has an estimated population of 5,086 and a density of 47 persons per km2. The total area is 108.70 km2.

Lavender farm

Furano is famous for its numerous fields of lavender.

Culture

Mascot

She is a gardener who lives in the Furano Lavender Fields (which is also her workplace). She loves to travel to gardens around the world and likes purple and green flowers. Her clothes were made from recycled melon skins and her hat and apron is scented from lavender. She is unveiled on 7 July 1995.

References

External links

Official Website 
Farm Tomita Website

Towns in Hokkaido